The politics of Australia take place within the framework of a federal parliamentary constitutional monarchy. Australia has maintained a stable liberal democratic political system under its Constitution, the world's tenth oldest, since Federation in 1901. Australia is the world's sixth oldest continuous democracy and largely operates as a two-party system in which voting is compulsory.  Australia is also a federation, where power is divided between the federal government and the states and territories.

The federal government is separated into three branches:

 Legislature: the bicameral Parliament, defined in section1 of the constitution as comprising the monarch (represented by the governor-general), the Senate, and the House of Representatives;
 Executive: the Federal Executive Council, which in practice gives legal effect to the decisions of the cabinet, comprising the prime minister and ministers of state who advise the governor-general;
 Judiciary: the High Court of Australia and other federal courts, whose judges are appointed by the governor-general on advice of the Federal Executive Council.

The Australian system of government combines elements derived from the political systems of the United Kingdom (fused executive, constitutional monarchy) and the United States (federalism, written constitution, strong bicameralism), along with distinctive indigenous features, and has therefore been characterised as a "Washminster mutation".

Legislative

The Parliament of Australia, also known as the Commonwealth Parliament or Federal Parliament, is the legislative branch of the government of Australia. It is bicameral, and has been influenced both by the Westminster system and United States federalism. Under Section 1 of the Constitution of Australia, Parliament consists of three components: the Monarch, the Senate, and the House of Representatives.

The Australian House of Representatives has 151 members, each elected for a flexible term of office not exceeding three years, to represent a single electoral division, commonly referred to as an electorate or seat. Voting within each electorate utilises the instant-runoff system of preferential voting, which has its origins in Australia. The party or coalition of parties which commands the confidence of a majority of members of the House of Representatives forms government; a party or coalition with a majority of seats may therefore form government in their own right, while those with a minority of seats must maintain confidence and supply from others such as independents and minor party members. The second-largest party or coalition in the House of Representatives forms the official opposition. 

The Australian Senate has 76 members. The six states return twelve senators each, and the two mainland territories return two senators each, elected through the single transferable voting system. Senators are elected for flexible terms not exceeding six years, with half of the senators contesting at each federal election. The Senate is afforded substantial powers by the Australian Constitution, significantly greater than those of Westminster upper houses such as those of the United Kingdom and Canada, and has the power to block legislation originating in the House as well as supply or monetary bills. As such, the Senate has the power to bring down the government, as occurred during the 1975 Australian constitutional crisis.

Because legislation must pass through both houses to become law, it is possible for disagreements between the House of Representatives and the Senate to hold up the progress of government bills indefinitely. Such deadlocks can be resolved through section 57 of the Constitution, using a procedure called a double dissolution election. Such elections are rare, not because the conditions for holding them are seldom met, but because they can pose a significant political risk to any government that chooses to call one. Of the six double dissolution elections that have been held since federation, half have resulted in the fall of a government. Only once, in 1974, has the full procedure for resolving a deadlock been followed, with a joint sitting of the two houses being held to deliberate upon the bills that had originally led to the deadlock. The most recent double dissolution election took place on 2 July 2016, which returned the Turnbull Government with a one-seat majority in the House of Representatives. The two pieces of legislation that triggered the election did not figure prominently in the eight-week election campaign.

Executive

The role of head of state in Australia is held by the Governor-General of Australia, acting as a representative of the Head of the Commonwealth. The functions and roles of the Governor-General include appointing ambassadors, ministers, and judges, giving Royal Assent to legislation (also a role of the monarch), issuing writs for elections and bestowing honours. The Governor-General is the President of the Federal Executive Council and Commander-in-Chief of the Australian Defence Force. These posts are held under the authority of the Australian Constitution. In practice, barring exceptional circumstances, the Governor-General exercises these powers only on the advice of the Prime Minister. As such, the role of Governor-General is often described as a largely ceremonial position. Since 1 July 2019, the Governor-General has been David Hurley.

The Prime Minister of Australia is leader of the Cabinet and head of government, holding office on commission from the Governor-General of Australia. The office of Prime Minister is, in practice, the most powerful political office in Australia. Despite being at the apex of executive government in the country, the office is not mentioned in the Constitution of Australia specifically and exists through an unwritten political convention. Barring exceptional circumstances, the prime minister is always the leader of the political party or coalition with majority support in the House of Representatives. The only case where a senator was appointed prime minister was that of John Gorton, who subsequently resigned his Senate position and was elected as a member of the House of Representatives (Senator George Pearce was acting prime minister for seven months in 1916 while Billy Hughes was overseas). Since 23 May 2022, the Prime Minister has been Anthony Albanese.

The Cabinet of Australia is the council of senior ministers responsible to Parliament. The Cabinet is appointed by the Governor-General, on the advice of the Prime Minister and serves at the former's pleasure. The strictly private Cabinet meetings occur once a week to discuss vital issues and formulate policy. Outside of the cabinet there are a number of junior ministers responsible for specific policy areas, who report directly to a senior Cabinet minister. The Constitution of Australia does not recognise the Cabinet as a legal entity, and its decisions have no legal force. All members of the ministry are also members of the Executive Council, a body which is – in theory, though rarely in practice – chaired by the Governor-General, and which meets solely to endorse and give legal force to decisions already made by the Cabinet. For this reason, there is always a member of the ministry holding the title Vice-President of the Executive Council.

Reflecting the influence of the Westminster system, and in accordance with section 64 of the Constitution, Ministers are selected from the elected members of Parliament. In keeping with the convention of Cabinet solidarity, all ministers are expected to defend the collective decisions of Cabinet regardless of their individual views. Ministers who cannot undertake the public defence of government actions are expected to resign. Such resignations are rare; and the rarity also of public disclosure of splits within cabinet reflects the seriousness with which internal party loyalty is regarded in Australian politics.

Judicial

The High Court of Australia is the supreme court in the Australian court hierarchy and the final court of appeal in Australia. It has both original and appellate jurisdiction, has the power of judicial review over laws passed by the Parliament of Australia and the parliaments of the States, and interprets the Constitution of Australia. The High Court is mandated by section 71 of the Constitution, which vests in it the judicial power of the Commonwealth of Australia. The High Court was constituted by the Judiciary Act 1903 (Cth). The High Court is composed of seven Justices: the Chief Justice of Australia, presently the Hon Susan Kiefel , and six other Justices.

The state supreme courts are also considered to be superior courts, those with unlimited jurisdiction to hear disputes and which are the pinnacle of the court hierarchy within their jurisdictions. They were created by means of the constitutions of their respective states or the Self Government Acts for the ACT and the Northern Territory. Appeals may be made from state supreme courts to the High Court of Australia.

Inferior Courts are secondary to Superior Courts. Their existence stems from legislation and they only have the power to decide on matters which Parliament has granted them. Decisions in inferior courts can be appealed to the Superior Court in that area, and then to the High Court of Australia.

Elections

At a national level, elections are held at least once every three years. The Prime Minister can advise the Governor-General to call an election for the House of Representatives at any time, but Senate elections can only be held within certain periods prescribed in the Australian Constitution. Although it is possible to hold elections for the House and Senate separately, it is the convention to hold simultaneous elections for both houses; every national election since 1974 has been for both the House and the Senate.

House of Representatives elections are contested by all seats. Representatives are elected using the Australian instant-runoff voting system, in which the winning candidate obtains over 50% of votes after distribution of preferences; therefore, preference flows from lower-polling candidates are frequently significant in electoral outcomes. Senate elections are contested by half the senators from each state, except in the case of a double dissolution where all senators contest the election; senators representing the territories are elected and sworn into office simultaneously with the House of Representatives rather than the rest of the Senate. All senators are elected using the single transferable voting system of proportional representation, which has resulted in a greater presence of minor parties in the Senate. With the exception of a three-year period from 2005 to 2008, no party or coalition has held a majority in the Senate since 1981; this has required governments to frequently seek the support of minor parties or independent senators holding the balance of power in order to secure their legislative agenda. 

Because the Senate's system of single transferable voting requires a lower quota than the House in order to obtain a seat, minor parties have often focused their election efforts on the upper house. This is true also at state level (only the two territories and Queensland are unicameral). Historically it has been comparatively rarer for minor parties and independents to win seats in the House of Representatives, although the size of the crossbench has been on an increasing trend since the 1990 federal election The most recent Australian federal election, which took place on 21 May 2022, saw the election of a historically large crossbench in the House of Representatives consisting of six minor party members and ten independents.

State and local government

Australia's six states and two territories are structured within a political framework similar to that of the Commonwealth. Each state has its own bicameral Parliament, with the exception of Queensland and the two territories, whose Parliaments are unicameral. Each state has a Governor, who undertakes a role equivalent to that of the Governor-General at the federal level, and a Premier, who is the head of government and is equivalent to the Prime Minister. Each state also has its own supreme court, from which appeals can be made to the High Court of Australia.

Elections in the six Australian states and two territories are held at least once every four years. In New South Wales, Victoria, South Australia and the Australian Capital Territory, election dates are fixed by legislation. However, the other state premiers and the Chief Minister of the Northern Territory have the same discretion in calling elections as the Prime Minister at national level.

Queensland is regarded as comparatively conservative. Victoria, Tasmania and the Australian Capital Territory are regarded as comparatively left of centre. New South Wales, the largest state by population, as well as South Australia have often been regarded as a politically moderate bellwether states. Western Australia, by contrast, tends to be more politically volatile - regarded as the most conservative state during the 2000-10s  it has lately swung to rank amongst the most left-leaning states in the country. 

Local government in Australia is the third (and lowest) tier of government, administered by the states and territories which in turn are beneath the federal tier. Unlike the United States, United Kingdom and New Zealand, there is only one level of local government in all states, with no distinction such as counties and cities. Today, most local governments have equivalent powers within a state, and styles such as "shire" or "city" refer to the nature of the settlements they are based around.

Ideology in Australian politics

The Australian party system has been described by political scientists as more ideologically driven than other similar Anglophone countries such as the United States and Canada. In early Australian political history, class interests played a significant role in the division between the then-democratic socialist Australian Labor Party and a series of anti-Labor parties drawing on the liberal and conservative traditions (the predecessors of the modern Coalition between the Liberals and Nationals).

In contemporary Australian political culture, the Coalition (Liberal and National parties) is considered centre-right and the Australian Labor Party is considered centre-left. Australian conservatism is largely represented by the Coalition, along with Australian liberalism. The Labor Party categorises itself as social democratic, although it has pursued a liberal economic and social policy since the prime ministership of Bob Hawke. 

Parliamentary Labor Party members such as Andrew Leigh have argued that the ALP should be reclassified as social liberal. The Labor Party still maintains its historical Socialist Objective in its constitution; however, it is seen by some as an ideological anachronism within the party.

In recent decades there has been a marked shift amongst the Australian electorate in providing their first preference votes to candidates to candidates not belonging to either of the two major parties. At the 2022 federal election 31% gave their preference to a non-major party candidate .

Political parties

Organised, national political parties have dominated Australia's political landscape since federation. The late 19th century saw the rise of the Australian Labor Party, which represented organised workers. Opposing interests coalesced into two main parties: a centre-right party with a base in business and the middle classes that has been predominantly conservative and moderate, now the Liberal Party of Australia; and a rural or agrarian conservative party, now the National Party of Australia. While there are a small number of other political parties that have achieved parliamentary representation, these main three dominate organised politics everywhere in Australia and only on rare occasions have any other parties or independent members of parliament played any role at all in the formation or maintenance of governments.

Australian politics operates as a two-party system, as a result of the permanent coalition between the Liberal Party and National Party. Internal party discipline has historically been tight, unlike the situation in other countries such as the United States. Australia's political system has not always been a two-party system (e.g. 1901 to 1910) but nor has it always been as internally stable as in recent decades.

The Australian Labor Party (ALP) is a social democratic party. It is a left leaning party with tendency towards social welfare and government assistance programs. It was founded by the Australian labour movement and broadly represents the urban working and middle classes.

The Liberal Party of Australia is a party of the centre-right which broadly represents businesses, the urban middle classes and many rural people. Its permanent coalition partner at national level is the National Party of Australia, formerly known as the Country Party, a conservative party which represents rural interests. These two parties are collectively known as the Coalition. In only Queensland, the two parties have officially merged to form the Liberal National Party, and in the Northern Territory, the National Party is known as the Country Liberal Party.

Minor parties in Australian politics include a green party, the Australian Greens, the largest of the minor parties; a centrist party, Centre Alliance; a nationalist party, Pauline Hanson's One Nation; and the right-wing party, Katter's Australian Party. Other significant parties in recent years have included the Reason Party, the Palmer United Party, the socially conservative Family First Party, among others. Historically significant parties have included the United Australia Party, the Australian Labor Party (Anti-Communist), the Communist Party of Australia, the socially liberal Australian Democrats among others.

Timeline

Since federation, there have been 30 Prime Ministers of Australia. The longest-serving Prime Minister was Sir Robert Menzies of the Liberal Party, who served for 19 years from 1939 to 1941, and again from 1949 to 1966. The only other Prime Minister to serve for longer than a decade was John Howard, also of the Liberal Party, who led for more than 11 years from 1996 to 2007. The Coalition and its direct predecessors have governed at the federal level for a large majority of Australia's history since federation: 30,548 days as compared to Labor's 12,252 days.

Prime ministers' parties by time in office
Liberal Party of Australia – {{#expr:
 + 1 + 
 + 1 + 
 + 1 + 
 + 1 + 
 + 1 + 
 + 1 + 
 + 1 + 
  
Australian Labor Party – {{#expr:
 + 1 + 
 + 1 + 
 + 1 + 
 + 1 + 
 + 1 + 
 + 1 + 
 + 1 + 
 + 1 + 
 + 1 + 
 + 1 + 
 + 1 + 
 + 1 + 
 + 1 + 
        
 }} days
 Nationalist Party –  days (Party Deregistered)
 United Australia Party –  days (Party Deregistered)
 Protectionist Party –  days (Party Deregistered)
 Commonwealth Liberal Party –  days (Party Deregistered)
 Free Trade Party –  days (Party Deregistered)
 Country Party –  days (Party Renamed)

House of Representatives primary, two-party and seat results
A two-party system has existed in the Australian House of Representatives since the two non-Labor parties merged in 1909. The 1910 election was the first to elect a majority government, with the Australian Labor Party concurrently winning the first Senate majority. Prior to 1909 a three-party system existed in the chamber. A two-party-preferred vote (2PP) has been calculated since the 1919 change from first-past-the-post to preferential voting and subsequent introduction of the Coalition. ALP = Australian Labor Party, L+NP = grouping of Liberal/National/LNP/CLP Coalition parties (and predecessors), Oth = other parties and independents.

Historical party composition of the Senate
The Senate has included representatives from a range of political parties, including several parties that have seldom or never had representation in the House of Representatives, but which have consistently secured a small but significant level of electoral support, as the table shows.

Results represent the composition of the Senate after the elections. The full Senate has been contested on eight occasions; the inaugural election and seven double dissolutions.  These are underlined and highlighted in puce.

See also

 Far-right politics in Australia
 Politics of New South Wales
 Politics of Queensland
 Politics of Western Australia
 Political donations in Australia
 Political families of Australia

References

Further reading

Robert Corcoran and Jackie Dickenson (2010), A Dictionary of Australian Politics, Allen and Unwin, Crows Nest, NSW
Department of the Senate, 'Electing Australia's Senators', Senate Briefs No. 1, 2006, retrieved July 2007
Rodney Smith (2001), Australian Political Culture, Longman, Frenchs Forest NSW